Tyrone "Tye" Tribbett (born January 26, 1976) is an American gospel music singer, songwriter and keyboardist. He is choir director and founder of the Grammy-nominated and Stellar Award-winning gospel group Tye Tribbett & G.A. (short for 'Greater Anointing.')

Biography
Tribbett was born on January 26, 1976, in Camden, New Jersey. He was raised in an Apostolic Pentecostal church in Camden, New Jersey. His father is Bishop Thomas Tyrone Tribbett, a former pastor, and his mother is Neicy Tribbett, a minister as well as a disc jockey in the Philadelphia and New York area.

He toured with Faith Hill in 2000, leading to work with Will Smith, Usher, Don Henley, Justin Timberlake, and Sting. He has since released five albums. The album "Greater Than" was released August 6, 2013, and earned him two Grammy awards. In 2017, he released "The Bloody Win".

Church 
Tribbett and Shanté, his wife, pastor the Live Church in Orlando, Florida.

Personal life
He is married to Shanté Tribbett, who was a member of Greater Anointing, and they have two daughters together. He admitted to an affair in 2009 with another member of his choir, leading to his wife having an affair of her own with Christian rapper Da' T.R.U.T.H., but both men and their wives later reconciled.

He also has a brother, Thaddaeus, who is part of the band "Soundcheck" and is now gigging for various artists. Tribbett also has two sisters; DeShantel Tribbett-Robinson and, DeMaris Tribbett-Toy, who sang in Greater Anointing.

Tribbett loves to spend time with his family and engage in upper body workouts.

In April 2020, Tribbett sent a message to people during the coronavirus pandemic with a song "We are gon' be alright", he fused Kendrick Lamar's hit track Alright into the song.

The Come Up with Tye Tribbett 
"The Come Up with Tye Tribbett” is an energetic and inspirational one hour daily radio show designed for R&B/Hip Hop, Rhythmic and Gospel/Inspirational stations, featuring the biggest hits from artists such as Jonathan McReynolds, LeCrae, The Hamiltones and more. The show is distributed by SupeRadio.

Discography

Albums

Extended Plays 

 Anyhow! - EP (2021)
Pandemic Praise! - EP (2021)
Work It Out! - EP (2021)

Singles

As a lead artist

As a featured artist

References

External links
Tye Tribbett's official website and messageboard
Tribbett's Sony website
Tye Tribbett interview on BlackGospel.com (2008)

American bandleaders
American Pentecostals
Grammy Award winners
Songwriters from New Jersey
Musicians from Camden, New Jersey
Living people
1976 births
21st-century American singers
20th-century American singers
African-American Christians
20th-century African-American male singers
20th-century American male singers
21st-century American male singers
African-American songwriters
21st-century African-American male singers
American male songwriters